Alphonsa is an Indian actress known for her works in South Indian films, predominantly in item numbers, supporting and cameo roles.

Career
Alphonsa played a supporting role in K. S. Ravikumar's Panchathanthiram (2002), appearing alongside Kamal Haasan in a few scenes like, before appearing in Kadhal Sadugudu (2003), opposite Vikram, where her work was described as "lewd".

Personal life
Alphonsa was born in Tamil Nadu. Her younger brother is choreographer Robert, who has also worked in films as an actor. Alphonsa married Nazeer, her co-star in Parvu Mazhai, in 2001, against the wishes of her family.

Alphonsa had lived with an upcoming actor, Vinod, in a live-in relationship for two years, before he committed suicide in 2012. Alphonsa also then attempted suicide in March 2012 by consuming excessive sleeping pills, but was saved. Reports initially emerged casting suspicion over the actress's involvement in Vinod's death. She later insisted that such allegations were baseless. She stated that Vinod had played the lead in a movie called Kavasam, alongside Murali, which was put on hold because of financial problems, and that the failure to make it as an actor in films despite half a decade of hard work had him feeling depressed enough to commit suicide.

Filmography

References

External links
 

Living people
Actresses from Chennai
Indian female dancers
21st-century Indian actresses
20th-century Indian actresses
Year of birth missing (living people)
Actresses in Malayalam cinema
Actresses in Tamil cinema
Actresses in Telugu cinema
Indian film actresses
Actresses in Kannada cinema
Dancers from Tamil Nadu
Actresses in Hindi cinema